Peter Bretherton (18 April 1905 – 26 June 1980) was an  Australian rules footballer who played with Geelong in the Victorian Football League (VFL).

Notes

External links 

1905 births
1980 deaths
Australian rules footballers from Victoria (Australia)
Geelong Football Club players